The women's singles tournament of the 2021 BWF World Championships took place from 12 to 19 December 2021 at the Palacio de los Deportes Carolina Marín at Huelva.

Seeds

The seeding list is based on the World Rankings of 23 November 2021.

 Tai Tzu-ying (final)
 Akane Yamaguchi (champion)
 Nozomi Okuhara (withdrew)
 Carolina Marín (withdrew)
 An Se-young (quarter-finals)
 P. V. Sindhu (quarter-finals)
 Ratchanok Intanon (quarter-finals)
 He Bingjiao (semi-finals)

<li> Pornpawee Chochuwong (third round)
<li> Michelle Li (third round)
<li> Busanan Ongbamrungphan (second round)
<li> Sayaka Takahashi (third round)
<li> Mia Blichfeldt (third round)
<li> Wang Zhiyi (third round)
<li> Yeo Jia Min (second round)
<li> Kim Ga-eun (third round)

Draw

Finals

Top half

Section 1

Section 2

Bottom half

Section 3

Section 4

References

2021 BWF World Championships